Ronald Borek Kessler (born Ronald Borek; December 31, 1943) is an American journalist and author of 21 non-fiction books about the White House, U.S. Secret Service, FBI, and CIA.

Personal life
Kessler was born in New York City to Dr. Ernest Borek and Minuetta Shumiatcher Borek, and grew up in Belmont, Massachusetts. After his parents got divorced and his mother remarried he adopted his step-father's last name. His father was born in Hungary and his mother was born in Russia. He attended Clark University in Worcester, Massachusetts from 1962 to 1964 before embarking on a career in journalism. Kessler is married and has two children.

Journalism

Early career
Kessler began his career in 1964 as a reporter with the Worcester Telegram, followed by three years as an investigative reporter and editorial writer with the Boston Herald. A series he wrote while there was instrumental in the installation of a better plaque commemorating the location of Boston's Pre-Revolutionary-War Liberty Tree. During these years, his reporting won awards from the American Political Science Association (public affairs reporting award, 1965), United Press International (1967) and the Associated Press (Sevellon Brown Memorial award, 1967). In 1968, he joined The Wall Street Journal as an investigative reporter in the New York bureau.

The Washington Post
From 1970 to 1985, Kessler was an investigative reporter for The Washington Post. In 1972, he won a George Polk Memorial award for Community Service because of two series of articles he wrote—one on conflicts of interest and mismanagement at Washington area non-profit hospitals, and a second series exposing kickbacks among lawyers, title insurance companies, realtors, and lenders in connection with real estate settlements, inflating the cost of buying homes. That Kessler series resulted in congressional passage in 1974 of the Real Estate Settlement Procedures Act (RESPA), which outlaws kickbacks for referral of settlement services in connection with real estate closings. For the two series, Kessler was named a Washingtonian of the Year for 1972 by  Washingtonian magazine. In 1979, Kessler  won a second Polk Award, this one for National Reporting for a series of articles exposing corruption in the General Services Administration; he won even though his editor, Ben Bradlee, had not submitted his stories for consideration. Kessler's Washington Post stories reporting that Lena Ferguson had been denied membership in the Daughters of the American Revolution (DAR) because she is black led to her acceptance by the DAR,  appointment to head the DAR Scholarship Committee, and widespread changes in the organization's policies to increase membership by blacks.

Author
Since leaving The Washington Post, Kessler has authored 21 nonfiction books on intelligence and current affairs. Seven of his books reached the hardcover nonfiction New York Times Best Seller list: The First Family Detail: Secret Service Agents Reveal the Hidden Lives of the Presidents (2014),The Secrets of the FBI (2011), In the President's Secret Service: Behind the Scenes With Agents in the Line of Fire and the Presidents They Protect (2009), described by USA Today as "the inside scoop on those stern-faced guys who protect the president," Laura Bush (2006), a biography of the first lady; A Matter of Character (2004), an admiring look at George W. Bush's presidency; The Season: Inside Palm Beach and America's Richest Society (1999), an investigative report on the lives of multi-billionaires in Palm Beach, Florida; and Inside the White House (1995), a behind-the-scenes expose of presidencies from Lyndon B. Johnson to Bill Clinton.."

Kessler's book, The FBI: Inside the World's Most Powerful Law Enforcement Agency, led to the dismissal by President Clinton of William S. Sessions as FBI director over his abuses. According to The Washington Post, "A Justice Department official ... noted that the original charges against Sessions came not from FBI agents but from a journalist, Ronald Kessler [who uncovered the abuses while writing a book about the FBI, leading to Sessions' dismissal by President Clinton] ..." The New York Times said Kessler's FBI book "did indeed trigger bureau and Justice Department investigations into alleged travel and expense abuses [by FBI Director William Sessions, leading to his departure] ...

In his book The Bureau: The Secret History of the FBI, Kessler presented the first credible evidence that Bob Woodward's and Carl Bernstein's Watergate source dubbed Deep Throat was FBI official W. Mark Felt. The book said that Woodward paid a secret visit to Felt in California and had his limousine park ten blocks away from Felt's home and walked to it so as not to attract attention. The New York Times said the book offers an "understanding of the institution's history, as well as an account of what it is like to be on the inside ... Kessler investigates the relationship between FBI directors and sitting presidents and also includes exclusive interviews with Robert Mueller, who led the FBI in the period immediately after 9/11." Jon Stewart of The Daily Show said Kessler's The Terrorist Watch: Inside the Desperate Race to Stop the Next Attack is a "very interesting look inside the FBI and CIA, which I think is unprecedented." The Washington Times said of the book, "Ronald Kessler is a veteran Washington-based investigative journalist on national security. His unparalleled access to top players in America's counterterrorism campaign allowed him a rare glimpse into their tradecraft, making The Terrorist Watch a riveting account."

Kessler's book, In the President's Secret Service: Behind the Scenes With Agents in the Line of Fire and the Presidents They Protect, was described by USA Today as a "fascinating exposé ... high-energy read ... amusing, saucy, often disturbing anecdotes about the VIPs the Secret Service has protected and still protects ... [accounts come] directly from current and retired agents (most identified by name, to Kessler's credit) ... Balancing the sordid tales are the kinder stories of presidential humanity ... [Kessler is a] respected journalist and former Washington Post reporter ... an insightful and entertaining story." Newsweek said of the book, "Kessler's such a skilled storyteller, you almost forget this is dead-serious nonfiction ... An afterword reveals new details about Kessler's discovery of a third uninvited intruder during last year's White House State Dinner ... The behind-the-scenes anecdotes are delightful, but Kessler has a bigger point to make, one concerning why the under-appreciated Secret Service deserves better leadership." FactCheck.org said, "His [Kessler's] book quotes both flattering and unflattering observations about presidents of both parties."

On April 14, 2012, Kessler broke the story that the Secret Service had removed and sent home agents assigned to protect President Obama during his trip to Cartagena, Colombia, because they had been involved in hiring prostitutes there.

Kessler's book The Secrets of the FBI presents revelations about the Russian spy swap, Marilyn Monroe's death, Vince Foster's suicide, the raid on Osama bin Laden's compound, and J. Edgar Hoover's sexual orientation. For the first time, it tells how the FBI caught spy Robert Hanssen in its midst and how secret teams of FBI agents break into homes, offices, and embassies to plant bugging devices without getting caught and shot as burglars.

Kessler's book The First Family Detail: Secret Service Agents Reveal the Hidden Lives of the Presidents debuted at #4 on the hardcover nonfiction New York Times Best Seller list. In the book Kessler reports that Vice President Joe Biden enjoys skinny dipping, which offends female agents, and that being assigned to his detail is considered to be the second worst protective assignment in the Secret Service after Hillary Clinton's detail. The book also reveals that the Secret Service covered up the fact that President Ronald Reagan's White House staff overruled the Secret Service to let unscreened spectators get close to Reagan as he left the Washington Hilton, allowing John W. Hinckley, Jr. to shoot the president. The New York Post called the book "a compelling look at the intrepid personnel who shield America's presidents and their families—and those whom they guard. Kessler writes flatteringly and critically about people in both parties."

Kessler's 2018 book was The Trump White House: Changing the Rules of the Game. The Washington Post'''s review, by Hugh Hewitt, called the book "trustworthy, and, in an unusual twist these days, it's favorable to the president. ... Kessler also got Trump to sit down for an interview on New Year's Eve at Mar-a-Lago, a conversation that shows the president confident and comfortable in his role. ... Kessler conveys Trump's world in coherent, readable fashion, and provides the players' assessments of one another."

Citing Kessler's two Secret Service books exposing the agency's laxness and corner cutting, SmartBlog on Leadership said, "One person [Ronald Kessler] was warning of the decline of the [Secret Service and its lapses and failures] well before the Salahis crashed a state dinner in 2009; well before the 2012 prostitute scandal in Colombia; before a knife-wielding man gained entrance to the White House last year; and before the recent episode in which drunk agents drove their car up to the White House and interrupted an active bomb investigation."

"Ron Kessler ... has enjoyed a reputation for solid reporting over the past four decades," Lloyd Grove wrote in his column in The Daily Beast. Franklin Pierce University awarded Kessler the Marlin Fitzwater Medallion for excellence as a prolific author, journalist, and communicator.

Articles
Kessler writes The Washington Post, The Wall Street Journal, Time, The Washington Times, and Politico opinion pieces, including "Surveillance: An American Success Story" on Politico, "Reform the Secret Service" in The Washington Post, and "The Real Joe McCarthy," which attacked efforts by some conservative writers to vindicate the late Senator Joseph McCarthy, and in The Wall Street Journal. Kessler’s op-ed “Time to Rename the J. Edgar Hoover Building” detailed Hoover’s “massive abuses and violations of Americans' rights” as FBI director for nearly 50 years.

In a Time magazine opinion piece, Kessler wrote "The Secret Service Thinks We Are Fools" after the White House intrusion based on his book The First Family Detail.

From 2006 to 2012, Kessler was chief Washington correspondent for Newsmax.

On January 4, 2010, Kessler wrote a Newsmax article revealing that the Secret Service allowed a third uninvited guest to attend President Obama's state dinner for Indian Prime Minister Manmohan Singh besides party crashers Tareq and Michaele Salahi on November 24, 2009. The Secret Service confirmed the third intrusion "following a report by Ronald Kessler, a journalist who writes for Newsmax.com", The Washington Post said. "Kessler reported that the agency discovered the third crasher after examining surveillance video of arriving guests and found one tuxedoed man who did not match any name on the guest list."

In an article for Newsmax, on March 16, 2008, Kessler incorrectly reported that Senator Barack Obama attended a service at Chicago's Trinity United Church of Christ on July 22, 2007, during which Rev. Jeremiah Wright gave a sermon that blamed world suffering on "white arrogance". The Obama campaign denied that Obama had attended the church on the day that sermon was delivered and other reporters discovered that Obama was in fact in transit to Miami, Florida on that day. Shortly after the controversy broke, Kessler confirmed to Talking Points Memo that he attempted to remove information documenting it from his English Wikipedia biography.

In "A Roadmap to Trump's Washington," Kessler described the carrot-and-stick approach Trump used to get his Mar-a-Lago estate approved as a club by Palm Beach Town Council members and predicted he would operate in the same manner as president to win over support for his agenda. In "The Anatomy of a Trump Decision," Kessler depicted how Trump makes decisions by focusing on his decision to turn his Mar-a-Lago estate in Palm Beach into a private club.

Criticism
Kessler's writings have been criticized in publications such as The Washington Post and The Week for overt partisanship and a lack of journalistic rigor.

In a note to The Week, Kessler disputed charges of inaccuracy, including uncertainty over whether then-Vice President Joe Biden had spent a million dollars of taxpayer funds to take personal trips on Air Force Two back and forth between Washington and his home in Wilmington. The publication agreed to update Ambinder's article, saying that "... author Ronald Kessler provided The Week with documentation from the Air Force about Vice President Biden's travel" and linked to the Air Force's letter responding to Kessler's Freedom of Information Act request with the official record of Biden's flights back and forth between Washington and Wilmington with their cost as listed in Kessler's book The First Family Detail.

Noting Kessler's extraordinary access to the then Secret Service Director, Mark Sullivan, during the writing of In The President's Secret Service, James Bamford wrote in a review in The Washington Post that:

However, in reviewing Kessler's book In the President's Secret Service, FactCheck.org said, "His [Kessler's] book quotes both flattering and unflattering observations about presidents of both parties."

A September 30, 2014 Politico piece by Kessler on Secret Service blunders, including allowing a knife-wielding intruder to race into the White House and failing to detect gun shots at the White House until four days later, was criticized by Josh Marshall of Talking Points Memo for allegedly implying that because he had not taken steps to correct the problems within the agency by replacing the director, President Obama would be at fault if the Secret Service's security breakdowns led to his own assassination. A subsequent editor's note called that a misinterpretation. The reference in question said, "Agents tell me that it's a miracle an assassination has not already occurred. Sadly, given Obama's colossal lack of management judgment, that calamity may be the only catalyst that will reform the Secret Service."

According to the U.S. Senate Select Committee on Intelligence report on CIA torture and the report itself as reported in The New York Times, Kessler's book, The CIA at War, "included inaccurate claims about the effectiveness of CIA interrogations" provided by the CIA to Kessler and New York Times reporter Douglas Jehl, such as the claim that the arrests of terrorist suspects were based on information from interrogations of other terrorists under torture. The report said this rationale was used to justify the use of torture. In a comment to The New York Times, Kessler said he corroborated what he was told with the FBI, and he called the Senate report discredited because it was written only by Democratic lawmakers and did not include interviews with many of the main players. Subsequently, John Brennan, President Obama's appointee as CIA director, said that while no one knows whether the information could have been obtained otherwise, "[o]ur review indicates that interrogations of detainees on whom EITs [enhanced interrogation techniques] were used did produce intelligence that helped thwart attack plans, capture terrorists, and save lives."

Books

References

External links

The Daily Show with Jon Stewart on In the President's Secret ServiceThe Daily Show with Jon Stewart on The Terrorist Watch''

 Book TV's In Depth interview with Kessler, April 5, 2015
Book TV's After Words interview with Kessler on The Trump White House: Changing the Rules of the Game, April 5, 2018
Booknotes interview with Kessler on The FBI: Inside the World's Most Powerful Law Enforcement Agency, September 12, 1993

1943 births
Clark University alumni
American biographers
American bloggers
American investigative journalists
American political writers
Historians of the Central Intelligence Agency
Living people
People from Belmont, Massachusetts
Journalists from New York City
21st-century American non-fiction writers
Historians from New York (state)
American male bloggers
American male biographers